Bob Hunter Memorial Park is a greenspace preserve in Markham, Ontario, Canada. It is named in honour of Robert Hunter, one of the founders of Greenpeace. The park was officially opened in August 2006 by then Premier of Ontario, Dalton McGuinty.

The city of Markham has a development plan for the park which includes renaturalizing the agricultural lands with Carolinian forests. In the spring of 2011,  of forest were planted, and in the summer of 2011 a project began to create a meadow on land formerly used for agriculture. The park is scheduled to open in 2015 and "…will feature hiking and biking trails, a nature trail, restored wetland and re-planted native woodland."

References

External links

Parks in the Regional Municipality of York
Tourist attractions in Markham, Ontario
2006 establishments in Ontario